Tattnall County High School is a public high school located in unincorporated Tattnall County, Georgia, United States, near Reidsville. The school is part of the Tattnall County School District, serving Tattnall County.

References

External links 
 Tattnall County School District website
 Tattnall County High School website

Schools in Tattnall County, Georgia
Public high schools in Georgia (U.S. state)